Smash-Up, the Story of a Woman, also called A Woman Destroyed, is a 1947 American drama film with elements of film noir that tells the story of a rising nightclub singer who marries another singer and becomes an alcoholic after sacrificing her career for him.

The film stars Susan Hayward, Lee Bowman, Eddie Albert and Marsha Hunt. The screenplay was written by John Howard Lawson based on a story written by Dorothy Parker, Frank Cavett and Lionel Wiggam. Produced by Walter Wanger under his personal contract with Hayward, the film was directed by Stuart Heisler. Ethel Wales appears in an uncredited part.

The film was nominated for Academy Awards for Best Actress in a Leading Role (Hayward) and Best Writing, Original Story.

Because the film contains a story similar to that of A Star Is Born, it was rumored to be a cryptic biography of Bing Crosby and his stormy first marriage to Dixie Lee. A scene that has been popular with critics and fans is the violent slapping and hair-pulling fight between rivals Hayward and Hunt in the ladies‘ powder room (a scene repeated by Hayward 20 years later in Valley of the Dolls).

This film is in the public domain.

Plot
In a hospital, nightclub singer Angie Evans, her face bandaged, recounts the events that brought her there.

Angie becomes involved with aspiring singer Ken Conway. Her agent Mike Dawson helps Ken and piano accompanist Steve Anderson secure a spot on a radio show singing cowboy songs. Ken sings a ballad on the day that Angie, now his wife, gives birth to their daughter. Ken's performance earns him a new career opportunity.

Ken soon achieves great success, gaining popularity and wealth, while Angie stays home. With her career at a standstill, she begins to drink. Ken counts on her to present a sophisticated image for his new high-society friends and contacts, but her alcoholism worsens, so secretary Martha Gray comes to Ken's aid.

Angie is certain that Ken and Martha are having an affair. Steve tries to intervene on Angie's behalf, but he can see that Martha has fallen in love with Ken.

Angie neglects her child, continues to drink, and then creates a scene at a party. Ken asks for a divorce and custody. Mike helps Angie find work in a club. She is determined to stay sober in order to regain custody of her daughter. Instead, she finds herself in a bar and wakes the next morning in the apartment of strangers who had found her unconscious on their stairs.

Angie kidnaps her daughter from the park and takes her to a house in the country where Angie dutifully gives the child dinner and puts her to bed. After she sings her daughter to sleep, Angie forgets a lit cigarette in the room. She begins to drink and indulges in memories before the child's shouts finally alert her to the fire. Angie rescues her daughter from the flames but suffers serious facial burns.

Realizing that she has hit rock bottom, Angie is positive that she can move forward happily. Ken has talked with her doctor and wishes to try to support her.

Cast
 Susan Hayward as Angie Evans (singing dubbed by Peg LaCentra) 
 Lee Bowman as Ken Conway (singing dubbed by Hal Derwin) 
 Eddie Albert as Steve Anderson
 Marsha Hunt as Martha Gray
 Carl Esmond as Dr. Lorenz
 Carleton G. Young as Fred Elliott
 Charles D. Brown as Michael Dawson
 Janet Murdoch as Miss Kirk, baby Angelica's nanny
 Sharyn Payne as Angelica "Angel" Conway
 Robert Shayne as Mr. Gordon
 Erville Alderson as Farmer at Fire (uncredited)
 Lee Shumway as Benson - Doorman (uncredited)

Reception
In a contemporary review for The New York Times, critic Bosley Crowther wrote: "This irony of life might make for drama of a genuinely touching sort, as it did in that memorable  picture of success and drunkenness, 'A Star Is Born.' But, actually, in the writing, this complex tension has been so weakly drawn that the reason for the lady's dipsomania seems completely arbitrary and contrived. Furthermore, the writer, John Howard Lawson, has so muddled the lady with motherless love that the story becomes a wallow less in liquor than in mawkish sentiment."

According to Variety, the film earned $2 million in U.S. box office receipts in 1947.

The film lost $111,664 in its initial release.

See also
 List of American films of 1947

References

External links

 
 
 
 
 

1947 films
1947 drama films
American drama films
American black-and-white films
Films about alcoholism
Films about music and musicians
Films directed by Stuart Heisler
Films produced by Walter Wanger
Films set in New York City
Films shot in New York City
Films with screenplays by Dorothy Parker
Universal Pictures films
Films scored by Frank Skinner
1940s American films